Sowali is a village in India, under the district of Nanded and is located between Biloli and Bodhan.

It was once the seat of the Deshmukhs of Sowali, where it also housed their castle of which only one burj (Bastion) remains.

Cities and towns in Nanded district